Yousef Khamis (born 1 April 1990) is a Saudi Arabian footballer who plays as a left back for Al-Sahel.

Career
Khamis started his career at Al-Nassr. He made his first-team debut on 31 March 2012 in the league match against Al-Taawoun. On 11 September 2013, Khamis joined Najran on loan. On 6 June 2014, Khamis joined Al-Khaleej on loan. On 1 June 2015, Khamis joined Al-Fateh on a three-year deal. On 20 June 2017, Khamis joined Al-Batin. On 23 November 2017, Khamis left Al-Batin without making a single appearance and joined Al-Khaleej. On 1 February 2019, Khamis joined Al-Orobah on a six-month deal. On 26 July 2019, Khamis joined Al-Ansar. On 17 October 2020, he joined Second Division side Al Safa. On 17 August 2021, Khamis joined Al-Kawkab. On 9 June 2022, Khamis joined Al-Sahel.

References

Living people
1990 births
Saudi Arabian footballers
People from Jizan Province
Al Nassr FC players
Najran SC players
Khaleej FC players
Al-Fateh SC players
Al Batin FC players
Al-Orobah FC players
Al-Ansar FC (Medina) players
Al Safa FC players
Al-Kawkab FC players
Al-Sahel SC (Saudi Arabia) players
Saudi Professional League players
Saudi First Division League players
Saudi Second Division players
Association football fullbacks